Alonte is a town in the province of Vicenza, Veneto, Italy. It is located north of Via San Feliciano.

Among the sights in the town is the Baroque church of San Biagio.

References

External links 
 
 (Google Maps)

Cities and towns in Veneto